Wilshire Branch Library is a branch library of the Los Angeles Public Library located in the Mid-Wilshire section of Los Angeles, California.  It was built in 1926 based on an  Italian Romanesque design by architect Allen Ruoff.

In 1987, the Wilshire Branch and several other branch libraries in Los Angeles were added to the National Register of Historic Places as part of a thematic group submission.   The application noted that the branch libraries had been constructed in a variety of period revival styles to house the initial branch library system of the City of Los Angeles.

See also

 National Register of Historic Places listings in Los Angeles
 List of Los Angeles Historic-Cultural Monuments in the Wilshire and Westlake areas
Los Angeles Public Library

References

External links
 Wilshire Branch Library - Los Angeles Public Library
 History of the Wilshire Branch Library, ca. 1930s
 Architectural analysis of Wilshire Branch Library, designed by architect Allen Kelly Ruoff and completed in 1927
 Staff-written brief history of Wilshire Branch Library
 Wilshire Branch Library: Summary 1936-1949
 Grand opening celebration for the Wilshire Branch, Aug. 8, 1996
 Faith Holmes Hyers, "Wilshire libraries serve as community centers and boosters of good citizenship" WILSHIRE PRESS, Mar. 27, 1947
 National Register of Historic Places Nomination Form, Los Angeles Public Library May 19, 1987

Libraries in Los Angeles
Mid-Wilshire, Los Angeles
Library buildings completed in 1926
Libraries on the National Register of Historic Places in Los Angeles
Los Angeles Historic-Cultural Monuments